Scarpe 1917 was a battle honour awarded to units of the British and Imperial Armies that took part in one or more of the following engagements in the Great War:
First Battle of the Scarpe, 9–14 Apr 1917
Second Battle of the Scarpe, 23–24 Apr 1917
Third Battle of the Scarpe, 3–4 May 1917

References

Battle honours of the British Army